Ahan Owuch was a populated place on the Tohono Oʼodham Reservation, in Pima County, Arizona, United States. The community was also known as Anuawooch.

References

Former populated places in Pima County, Arizona